Gyminda orbicularis is a species of plant in the family Celastraceae. It is endemic to Cuba.

References

Endemic flora of Cuba
orbicularis
Vulnerable plants
Taxonomy articles created by Polbot